The Johnnie Range is a mountain range in the Mojave Desert, in southern Nye County, Nevada, United States.

References 

Mountain ranges of Nevada
Amargosa Desert
Mountain ranges of Nye County, Nevada
Mountain ranges of the Mojave Desert
Mountain ranges of the Great Basin